Biyaheng Bulilit is a travel magazine show. It features tourists spots in the Philippines from the perspectives of two Japanese nationals Ya Chang and Tatay Nishii and an inquisitive Filipino child, Chacha Cañete, who is eager to learn about her motherland. 

It is a four (4) consecutive year Anak TV Seal Awardee  (2011, 2012, 2013, 2014) 

The show first aired in May 2010 on Studio 23. Biyaheng Bulilit is now in its 8th season and airs internationally on The Filipino Channel.

Hosts
Chacha Cañete
Ya Chang
Tatay Nishii

See also
List of programs aired by Studio 23
List of programs broadcast by ABS-CBN Sports and Action

References

Studio 23 original programming
2010 Philippine television series debuts
2014 Philippine television series endings